Taurus Robert Johnson (born April 13, 1986) is an American football wide receiver who is currently a free agent. He was signed by the Kansas City Chiefs as an undrafted free agent in 2009. He played college football at South Florida.

Johnson has also been a member of the Detroit Lions, Miami Dolphins, Hartford Colonials, and Washington Redskins.

Early years
Johnson attended Cape Coral High School, in Cape Coral, Florida.  He was rated a three-star recruit by Rivals and was ranked the 35th best wide out in the country and 45th overall in the state of Florida.  He originally gave a verbal commitment to the University of Florida but after the firing of Head Coach Ron Zook, Johnson backed out on his verbal and decided on the University of South Florida.

College career
Johnson played college football at the University of South Florida and finished second in South Florida history in kickoff returns (29) and third in kickoff return yards (784 yards).

Professional career

Kansas City Chiefs
He was signed by the Chiefs as an undrafted free agent in 2009 and was on the team throughout the offseason before he was released in the final cuts.

Detroit Lions
Johnson was signed to the practice squad of the Detroit Lions on September 29, 2009.  About a month later, on November 3, the Detroit Lions released Johnson from their practice squad.

Miami Dolphins
Johnson was signed to the Miami Dolphins' practice squad on December 1, 2009. After his contract expired following the season, Johnson was re-signed to a future contract on January 5, 2010. He was waived on August 12.

Hartford Colonials
In 2010, Johnson played for the Hartford Colonials of the United Football League.

Washington Redskins
Johnson was signed by the Washington Redskins to their practice squad in 2010. He was waived on July 30, 2011.

References

http://www.redskins.com/team/

External links
South Florida Bulls bio

1986 births
Living people
Sportspeople from Fort Myers, Florida
Players of American football from Florida
American football return specialists
American football wide receivers
South Florida Bulls football players
Kansas City Chiefs players
Detroit Lions players
Miami Dolphins players
Hartford Colonials players
Washington Redskins players
San Jose SaberCats players
Chicago Rush players